Edward Hastings may refer to:

 Edward Hastings, stage director of American Conservatory Theater
 Edward Hastings (died 1603), MP for Leicestershire and Tregony
 Edward Hastings, 1st Baron Hastings of Loughborough (c.1521–1571)
 Edward Hastings, 2nd Baron Hastings (1466–1506)
Edward Hastings, (1781-1861), British painter
 Edward Hastings (cricketer) (1849–1905), Australian cricketer
 Ned Hastings, also known as Edward Hastings (born 1966), American video maker